"Drifting" is a song by American rapper G-Eazy. It features vocals from American singer Chris Brown and Canadian rapper Tory Lanez. It was released on April 17, 2016 as the third single of his second studio album When It's Dark Out. The song was produced by Cashmere Cat, Mssingno, and Happy Pérez.

Music video
The song's accompanying music video premiered on April 19, 2016 on G-Eazy's Vevo account on YouTube.

Chart performance
On the week of December 26, 2015, "Drifting" debuted at number 98 on the Billboard Hot 100, but left the next week. That same week, it debuted at number 33 on the Hot R&B/Hip-Hop Songs chart. On March 13, 2019, the single was certified platinum for sales of over a million digital copies in the United States.

Charts

Weekly charts

Certifications

References

External links

2016 singles
2015 songs
G-Eazy songs
Chris Brown songs
Tory Lanez songs
RCA Records singles
Songs written by Chris Brown
Songs written by Cashmere Cat
Songs written by Happy Perez
Songs written by Tory Lanez
Song recordings produced by Cashmere Cat
Songs written by G-Eazy